Shazia Jawaid is a Pakistani politician who had been a Member of the Provincial Assembly of Sindh, from June 2013 to May 2018.

Early life
She was born on 30 November 1979.

Political career

She was elected to the Provincial Assembly of Sindh as a candidate of Muttahida Qaumi Movement on a reserved seat for women in 2013 Pakistani general election.

References

Living people
Sindh MPAs 2013–2018
Women members of the Provincial Assembly of Sindh
1979 births
Muttahida Qaumi Movement politicians
21st-century Pakistani women politicians